Play It Again, Charlie Brown is the seventh prime-time animated TV special based upon the comic strip Peanuts, by Charles M. Schulz. It originally aired on CBS on March 28, 1971.

This was the first Peanuts TV special of the 1970s, airing nearly a year-and-a-half after It Was a Short Summer, Charlie Brown, and was the first special to focus on a character other than Charlie Brown or Snoopy. (The feature film A Boy Named Charlie Brown had been released in between the two specials.)

It also marked the first time someone other than Peter Robbins voiced Charlie Brown, which in this case was Chris Inglis as the character, since Robbins' voice deepened after the previous special. Also, all the other remaining original actors from the first special, except for Bill Melendez, were replaced by someone else. This left Bill Melendez as the only original actor remaining, until his death on September 2, 2008. However, recordings of his voice were used in later Peanuts animated media.

In the special, Lucy talks Schroeder into playing his piano for a PTA meeting, but there are unforeseen details that he will not tolerate.

Voice cast
Danny Hjelm as Schroeder
Peter Robbins as Schroeder screaming (archived)
Pamelyn Ferdin as Lucy van Pelt
Stephen Shea as Linus van Pelt
Lynda Mendelson as Frieda
Hilary Momberger as Sally Brown
Chris Inglis as Charlie Brown/Pig-Pen
Christopher DeFaria as Peppermint Patty (credited as Kip DeFaria)
Bill Melendez as Snoopy
Unnamed female voice as PTA meetings spray cans

Music score
The majority of music cues for Play It Again, Charlie Brown consist of works composed by Ludwig van Beethoven. Eight different piano sonatas and one symphony appear in the television special. Remaining cues were divided between Vince Guaraldi, John Scott Trotter and Harry Bluestone and are noted as such. Trotter also conducted and arranged the score, and received an Emmy nomination for his work on the special.
 

Piano Sonata No. 3 in C Major, Opus 2: I. Allegro Con Brio (three separate cues)
"Stupid Beagle" (John Scott Trotter)
Piano Sonata No. 3 in C Major, Opus 2: I. Allegro Con Brio (three separate cues)
Symphony No. 5 in C Minor, Opus 67: I. Allegro Con Brio
Piano Sonata No. 4 in E Major, Opus 7: III. Allegro, ; "Trio" in E minor
"Play It Again, Charlie Brown" (aka "Charlie's Blues" and "Charlie Brown Blues") (electric version) (Vince Guaraldi)
Piano Sonata No. 10 in G Major, Opus 14, No. 2: I. Allegro in G major (two separate cues)
"Oh, Good Grief" (Vince Guaraldi, Lee Mendelson)
Piano Sonata No, 14 in C minor ("Moonlight Sonata"), Opus 27, No. 2: II. Allegretto
Piano Sonata No, 14 in C minor ("Moonlight Sonata"), Opus 27, No. 2: III. Presto agitato
"Lucifer's Lady" (Vince Guaraldi)
Piano Sonata No. 21 in C Major ("Waldstein"), Opus 53: III. Rondo. Allegretto moderato – Prestissimo
"Peppermint Patty" (electric band version) (Vince Guaraldi)
Piano Sonata No. 20 in G Major, Opus 49, No. 2: I. Allegro ma non troppo, 
Piano Sonata No. 25 in G Major, Opus 79: I. Presto alla tedesca
"Happy, Happy" (acid rock-style jam) (Vince Guaraldi)
"Charlie's Rock" (John Scott Trotter)
"Tune Up No. 1"
"Charlie's Rock" (John Scott Trotter)
"Play It Again, Charlie Brown" (slow version sans percussion) (Vince Guaraldi)
Tune Up No. 2: "My Dog Has Fleas"
"Happy" (Harry Bluestone)
Piano Sonata No. 29 in B Major ("Hammerklavier"), Opus 106: I. Allegro
"Play It Again, Charlie Brown" (acid rock version) (Vince Guaraldi)

No official soundtrack for Play It Again, Charlie Brown has been released. However, recording session master tapes for seven 1970s-era Peanuts television specials scored by Vince Guaraldi were discovered by his son, David Guaraldi, in the mid-2000s. A version of the program's eponymous song featured in There's No Time for Love, Charlie Brown (1973) was released in 2007 on the compilation album, Vince Guaraldi and the Lost Cues from the Charlie Brown Television Specials.

Harpsichordist Lillian Steuber performed all Beethoven piano sonatas.

Credits
 Created and Written by: Charles M. Schulz
 Directed by: Bill Melendez
 Produced by: Lee Mendelson and Bill Melendez
 Musical Score Composed by: Ludwig van Beethoven, Vince Guaraldi
 Conducted by: John Scott Trotter
 Beethoven Sonatas Played by: Lillian Steuber
 Graphic Blandishment: Ed Levitt, Bernard Gruver, Evert Brown, Dean Spille, Frank Smith, Rudy Zamora, Don Lusk, Bill Littlejohn, Emery Hawkins, Al Pabian, Sam Jaimes, Beverly Robbins, Eleanor Warren, Carole Barnes, Faith Kovaleski, Manon Washburn
 Editing: Bob Gillis, Chuck McCann, Rudy Zamora, Jr.
 Sound:
 Radio Recorders, Sid Nicholas
 United Recorders, Arte Becker
 Producers' Sound Service, Don Minkler
 Camera: Dickson/Vasu
 In Cooperation with United Feature Syndicate
 THE END "Play It Again, Charlie Brown" © 1971 United Feature Syndicate

Home media
The special was first released on home media on RCA's SelectaVision CED format in 1983, along with Charlie Brown's All Stars!, It's a Mystery, Charlie Brown, and What a Nightmare, Charlie Brown. The special was released on VHS by Media Home Entertainment in 1986, and again under its kids subdivision Hi-Tops Video in 1989. Paramount Home Media Distribution released the special on September 6, 1995. Warner Home Video released it as part of the Peanuts: 1970's Collection: Volume 1 DVD on October 6, 2009. The special was again released on the 4K edition of A Charlie Brown Thanksgiving in 2017.

References

External links
 

1970s animated television specials
CBS television specials
Peanuts television specials
Films about entertainers
Television shows directed by Bill Melendez
1970s American television specials
1971 television specials
1971 in American television